Scutellastra peronii is a species of sea snail, a true limpet, a marine gastropod mollusk in the family Patellidae, one of the families of true limpets.

In Australian coastal waters it is found from south-east Queensland, New South Wales, Victoria, Tasmania, South Australia through to Shark Bay, in Western Australia.

Description

Distribution

References

Patellidae
Gastropods described in 1825